Pride 34: Kamikaze was a mixed martial arts event held by Pride Fighting Championships on April 8, 2007 at the Saitama Super Arena in Saitama, Japan.

Background
This was the last Pride show promoted by Dream Stage Entertainment before the sale of the company (see Pride Worldwide). The promotion folded shortly after the event.

Although Wanderlei Silva and Mauricio Rua were negotiating with Pride to compete, neither did. Silva did not participate because of a medical suspension received from the Nevada State Athletic Commission. The commission had stated that if a Japanese doctor cleared Silva for competition, they would consider lifting the suspension three days early, but this did not come to fruition.

Gilbert Yvel was originally slated to fight Bazigit Atajev, but Atajev withdrew due to an internal disease.

Nobuyuki Sakakibara's "surprise announcement" at the event turned out to be a guest appearance by Kazushi Sakuraba who had left Pride nearly a year ago to join rival promotion Hero's. Kiyoshi Tamura joined Sakakibara in the ring and teased a potential matchup in a future Pride event. Sakuraba had initially expressed his wish to fight either Wanderlei Silva or Kiyoshi Tamura on the card but in the end neither fight materialized. Though Tamura would end up fighting Sakuraba at Dynamite!! 2008

Results

See also 
 Pride FC
 List of Pride FC champions
 List of Pride FC events
 2007 in Pride FC

References

Pride Fighting Championships events
2007 in Japan
2007 in mixed martial arts
Mixed martial arts in Japan
Sport in Saitama (city)